Oregon Route 380 (OR 380) is an Oregon state highway running from Prineville to Paulina. OR 380 is known as the Paulina Highway No. 380 (see Oregon highways and routes). OR 380 was assigned to the Paulina Highway in 2002.

Route description

OR 380 begins at an intersection with U.S. Route 26 (US 26) at Prineville and heads east through Post to Paulina, where it ends at the Beaver Creek Bridge.

History
OR 380 was established in 2002 as part of Oregon's project to assign route numbers to highways that previously were not assigned.

Major intersections

See also

References

 Oregon Department of Transportation, Descriptions of US and Oregon Routes, https://web.archive.org/web/20051102084300/http://www.oregon.gov/ODOT/HWY/TRAFFIC/TEOS_Publications/PDF/Descriptions_of_US_and_Oregon_Routes.pdf, page 30.

380
Transportation in Crook County, Oregon